Henri Laupmaa (born 14 March 1975) is an Estonian IT entrepreneur and a board member of the Estonian Nature Fund.

He has studied international management in Concordia International University Estonia and Concordia University Wisconsin (BA, 1997) and graphics design in Estonian Art Academy.

Henri Laupmaa founded Let's Do It! World a movement to clean up the world's environment of illegal trash and has taken part of TEDx Tallinn conference organizing from its start in 2009. Member of the Estonian President's Though Council from 2012 to 2016.

Developed Community Tools software between 2010 and 2014.

Founded the first creative crowdfunding platform in Estonia called Hooandja in 2012.

Founded the equity crowdfunding platform Fundwise in 2015.

References

Estonian businesspeople
1975 births
Living people